Daegu Stadium, also known as the Blue Arc, is a multi-purpose sports stadium located in Daegu, South Korea. It was formerly named Daegu World Cup Stadium but was changed to Daegu Stadium on 5 March 2008. It has a seating capacity for 66,422 people, and parking for 3,550 cars. It is located approximately 11 kilometers or 20 minutes by car from Daegu Airport. It is managed by the Daegu Sports Facilities Management Center.

It was one of the host venues of the 2002 FIFA World Cup and the main stadium for the 2003 Summer Universiade and the 2011 World Championships in Athletics. It was the home stadium of Daegu FC until 2018.

Construction
The construction was completed in May 2001 at a cost of 265,000,000 USD. The roof was engineered by the international consultancy WS Atkins. The roof is in two sections, each with an inclined trussed steel arch spanning 273 m for a rise of only 28.7 m, and propped by 13 secondary arches off a perimeter second "arch" that is supported by raking columns. The total roof steel weight is 4,350 t. The roof cladding is a PTFE-coated glass-reinforced fabric canopy. The modelling (form-finding) and analysis of the tensile roof was performed by Tensys. Wind tunnel studies were carried out by BMT Limited to assess the wind loading on the roof.

2002 FIFA World Cup
The stadium was the largest stadium in South Korea during the 2002 FIFA World Cup. It held the following matches:

Events

Daegu Marathon
Daegu World Cup Stadium hosts the Daegu Marathon annually in April of each year.

Concerts
The stadium was also the venue for the 8th Asia Song Festival, organised by Korea Foundation for International Culture Exchange, in 2011.

See also
List of sports venues in South Korea

References

External links
 Daegu Sports Facilities Management Center 

Daegu FC
2002 FIFA World Cup stadiums in South Korea
2001 FIFA Confederations Cup stadiums in South Korea
Football venues in South Korea
Athletics (track and field) venues in South Korea
Sports venues in Daegu
Sports venues completed in 2001
2001 establishments in South Korea
K League 1 stadiums
K League 2 stadiums